Uria may refer to:

Uria, a genus of auks
Uria, see Oria (town)
Uria, a village in Sprâncenata Commune, Olt County, Romania
Uria (river), a tributary of the Olt in Vâlcea County, Romania
Uria, Lord of Searing Flames, one of the three Sacred Beast Cards from the Yu-Gi-Oh! Trading Card Game
Uria, Hebrew biblical name, see Uriah (disambiguation)
As a suffix, -uria (from Greek ouron, urine) indicates either a disease affecting the urine or the presence in the urine of a particular substance.